Great Falls is a series of rapids and waterfalls on the Potomac River,  upstream from Washington, D.C., on the border of Montgomery County, Maryland and Fairfax County, Virginia. Great Falls Park, managed as part of George Washington Memorial Parkway, is on the southern banks in Virginia, and Chesapeake and Ohio Canal National Historical Park parkland is along the northern banks of the river in Maryland. Both are operated by the National Park Service. The Potomac and the falls themselves are legally entirely within Maryland, with the state and county boundaries following the south bank of the river.

Scenic views are offered on both the Maryland side and the Virginia side.  The Billy Goat Trail on Bear Island, accessible from Maryland, offers scenic views of the Great Falls, as do vantage points on Olmsted Island (also accessible from Maryland).  There are overlook points on the Virginia side.

The Great Falls area is popular for outdoor activities such as kayaking, whitewater rafting, rock climbing, and hiking.

Great Falls and Little Falls (about 5 miles downstream) are named in contradistinction to one another.

History
The rocks of the falls date to the late Precambrian and are about 750 million years old. The rocks are a resistant metamorphized schist, gneisses, metagraywackes, and metaconglomerates. The Falls formed the last time sea level dropped, during the Last Glacial Period about 35,000 years ago, causing the Potomac to downcut its valley. As sea level rises again, the power of the falls will be reduced due to a shorter vertical drop and likewise downcutting will slow down. Should the ocean level ever exceed the height of the falls again, downcutting would reverse entirely with silt filling in the now-underwater falls. 

The Potomac narrows significantly as it passes over the falls and through Mather Gorge.  Heavy rain or snow in the watershed upstream causes white-water floods which entirely submerge the rocks and even threaten the adjacent park visitor center (built on stilts for this reason). A pillar at the Virginia overlook, well above the river, marks the level reached during the 1936 Northeastern United States Floods.

Canals 

Multiple canal systems were built around Great Falls. The remains of the Patowmack Canal, built in the 18th century, can be found on the Virginia side. The canal was commissioned by George Washington and consisted of a system of 5 locks to allow barges to avoid the falls. Later on, the Chesapeake and Ohio Canal was built in the early 19th century on the Maryland side of the falls. It ultimately connected the Potomac tidewater with Cumberland, Maryland. The Chesapeake and Ohio Canal also used the Great Falls as a feeder (now abandoned) to supply water for its own use.

References

External links 

 Great Falls Park Visitor Centers official site

Cascade waterfalls
George Washington Memorial Parkway
Landforms of Fairfax County, Virginia
Landforms of Montgomery County, Maryland
Potomac River
Rapids of the United States
Tourist attractions in Fairfax County, Virginia
Tourist attractions in Montgomery County, Maryland
Waterfalls of Maryland
Waterfalls of Virginia